The American Saddlebred Horse Association (abbreviated ASHA) is the oldest horse breed registry for an American breed in the United States. It was founded in 1891 and is headquartered at the Kentucky Horse Park in Lexington, Kentucky.

History
The American Saddlebred Horse Association was formed in 1891 as the National Saddle Horse Breeders' Association. General John B. Castleman was the first president. It was originally located in Louisville, Kentucky, and all horses had to perform five gaits in order to be issued registration papers. In 1980 the association's name was changed to the American Saddlebred Horse Association.

Registration
All horses registered with ASHA are pure or half-bred American Saddlebreds. The association registers approximately 2,000 horses a year.

Competition
Most Saddlebred shows are held through the United States Equestrian Federation (USEF) in partnership with ASHA. The association also partners with the United States Hunter/Jumper Association, United States Dressage Federation, United States Pony Clubs, and United States Driving Association.

References

External links
Official website
Saddlebreds
Organizations based in Lexington, Kentucky
1891 establishments in Kentucky
Equestrian organizations headquartered in Kentucky
Organizations established in 1891